PSG College of Technology (often abbreviated as PSG Tech) is an autonomous, government aided, private engineering college in Coimbatore, India. It is affiliated with Anna University. It is affiliated to PSG and Sons Charities Trust. Among engineering colleges in India, PSG College of Technology was ranked 6th in private engineering colleges by India Today in 2018.

History

PSG College of Technology was first established as PSG Industrial Institute in the year 1926 by PSG and Sons Charities in Peelamedu, Coimbatore. The engineering college was started in the institute campus in 1951 by G. R. Damodaran, who became its first principal. The college was conferred autonomous status by University of Madras in 1978, which was continued by the Bharathiar University and subsequently by Anna University since 2001.

About 50 full-time and part-time programs in science, engineering and management at undergraduate and postgraduate levels by the 11 engineering and technology, computer applications, management sciences, basic sciences and humanities departments. The institute offers three 5-year integrated sandwich engineering courses which combines class room coaching with industrial training, one of the few in the country to offer such a course. Among the undergraduate and postgraduate programmes offered by the college, many are accredited by the National Board of Accreditation of the All India Council of Technical Education (AICTE). Being autonomous, the college frames its own curricula, updates syllabus, introduces new courses and is empowered to administer its own evaluation.

Rankings

Among engineering colleges in India, PSG College of Technology ranked 30 among engineering colleges by India Today in 2020, and 8 among private engineering colleges in India by Outlook India in 2022. The National Institutional Ranking Framework (NIRF) ranked it 49th among engineering institutes in 2020 and 85th overall. NIRF also ranked it 46th in the management ranking.

Student life

Clubs
The Students Union is the apex body which controls all the aspects of student life including associations, clubs and societies.

Clubs:
Youth Red Cross society,Global Leaders' Forum, Tech Music,
Drawing and Painting Club,
Book Readers' Club,
Entrepreneurs Club, 
Photography Club, 
Dramatic Club,
IEEE association,
Radio Hub,
Planning Forum etc...

Apart from these clubs, The college also has a Formula student team - Pegasus Racing, a Baja team and student wings of NCC and NSS.

Hostel
PSG Tech hostel was established on 27 February 1958. The hostels accommodates about 4300 students in 14 blocks named from A to N of which 5 blocks dedicated to women. There are five student dining halls, an auditorium, a library,a gym,a computer center and a guest house attached to the hostels.

Symposiums
Since 2005, the college conducts an international techno-management festival called Kriya. Every year in February, PSG also plays host to Renaissance, a two-day inter-collegiate cultural festival. Intrams is the intra-college cultural festival which is conducted in September.

Notable alumni
 
Aparna B Marar, classical dancer
Y. S. Chowdary, former Minister of State, Science and Technology & Earth Sciences, Government of India
Cottalango Leon, winner of Academy Award
Gopal Menon, documentary filmmaker
Jose K. Mani, Member of Parliament in the Rajya Sabha
Kalidhindi B. R. Varma, Vice-chancellor, Sri Sathya Sai Institute of Higher Learning
Lakshmi Narayanan, ex-vice chairman and ex-CEO of Cognizant and Chairman of ICT Academy
G. V. Loganathan, former professor, Virginia Tech
Madhu Bhaskaran, engineer and Professor at RMIT University
Madhusudhan Rao Lagadapati, executive chairman of Lanco Infratech
Mahesh Muthuswami, cinematographer
Mylswamy Annadurai, director of Chandrayaan-1 and Chandrayaan-2, ISRO
Navin Ramankutty, Professor of Global Food Security and Sustainability at the University of British Columbia
K. Pandiarajan, businessman and politician
Ramachandran Govindarasu, former secretary of ADMK (IT Wing)
A. G. Ramakrishnan, professor, Indian Institute of Science
Shiv Nadar, Founder and Chairman of HCL Technologies
Siva Umapathy, Shanti Swarup Bhatnagar laureate
Sundar Raman, CEO of Reliance Sports and Cricket Administrator
Sundaram Karivardhan, industrialist and motorsport pioneer
C Vijayakumar, CEO, HCL Technologies
R. M. Vasagam. space scientist and former Project Director, Ariane Passenger Payload Experiment

References

External links

 

Colleges affiliated to Anna University
All India Council for Technical Education
Engineering colleges in Coimbatore
Engineering colleges in Tamil Nadu
Educational institutions established in 1951
1951 establishments in Madras State
Sports venues in Coimbatore
Academic institutions formerly affiliated with the University of Madras